Tim Peter Bollerslev (born May 11, 1958) is a Danish economist, currently the Juanita and Clifton Kreps Professor of Economics at Duke University. A fellow of the Econometric Society, Bollerslev is known for his ideas for measuring and forecasting financial market volatility and for the GARCH (generalized autoregressive conditional heteroskedasticity) model.

Biography
Tim Bollerslev received his MSc in economics and mathematics in 1983 from the Aarhus University in Denmark. He continued his studies in the U.S., earning his Ph.D. in 1986 from the University of California at San Diego with a thesis titled Generalized Autoregressive Conditional Heteroskedasticity with Applications in Finance written under the supervision of Robert F. Engle (Nobel Prize in Economics winner in 2003).

After his graduate studies, Bollerslev taught at the Northwestern University between 1986–1995 and at the University of Virginia between 1996–1998. Since 1998 he is the Juanita and Clifton Kreps Professor of Economics at Duke University.

He and Mark Watson are widely regarded as carrying forward the work of the Nobel Prize-winning economist Robert F. Engle, as acknowledged by Engle himself.

He was a co-editor of the Journal of Applied Econometrics.

Articles

References

External links 
 Bollerslev's Duke page

1958 births
Living people
Duke University faculty
20th-century Danish economists
University of California, San Diego alumni
Northwestern University faculty
Fellows of the Econometric Society
21st-century Danish economists